Amadeus is a computer reservation system (or global distribution system, since it sells tickets for multiple airlines) owned by the Amadeus IT Group with headquarters in Madrid, Spain. The central database is located at Erding, Germany. The major development centres are located in Sophia Antipolis (France), Bangalore (India), London (UK), and Boston (United States). In addition to airlines, the CRS is also used to book train travel, cruises, car rental, ferry reservations, and hotel rooms. Amadeus also provides New Generation departure control systems to airlines. Amadeus IT Group is a transaction processor for the global travel and tourism industry. The company is structured around two key related areas—its global distribution system and its "IT Solutions" business area.

Amadeus is a member of IATA, OTA and SITA. Its IATA airline designator code is 1A.

Other major reservation systems

 AirCore
 Galileo
iFlyRes 
 Navitaire (also owned by Amadeus)
 Sabre
 TravelSky
 Worldspan

See also
Amadeus IT Group
Code sharing
Passenger Name Record

References

Computer reservation systems